"Back and Forth" is a 1987 single by Cameo, and was released on February 24, 1987.

Chart performance
The single was the third release from Cameo's, Word Up! album and was the group's twelfth top 10 soul single peaking at number three for two weeks and peaked at number fifty on the pop charts making it their fourth entry on the Hot 100. "Back and Forth" was also the group's third top ten on the dance chart, peaking at number six.

Music video
Jazz musician Miles Davis makes a cameo in the song's music video.

Popular culture
The chorus of the song: "Back, back and forth and forth..." is used on the hip hop group Wu-Tang Clan's single "Gravel Pit".
The song appears in video game Grand Theft Auto V on the Space 103.2 radio station.

Charts

Weekly charts

Year-end charts

References

1987 singles
Cameo (band) songs
1986 songs
Songs written by Larry Blackmon
American dance-pop songs